Crotalus tancitarensis, commonly known as the Tancitaro rattlesnake, is a species of venomous snake of the family Viperidae.

Geographic range
The snake is endemic to the state of Michoacán in southwestern Mexico.

References 

Reptiles described in 2004
Reptiles of Mexico
tancitarensis